The 1955 Copa del Generalísimo Juvenil was the fifth staging of the tournament. The competition began on May 1, 1955, and ended on June 5, 1955, with the final.

First round

|}

Second round

|}

Third round

|}

Quarterfinals

|}

Replay Game

|}

Semifinals

|}

Final

|}

Copa del Rey Juvenil de Fútbol
Juvenil